Zemah (literally: plant; also spelled  Tzemach, Tzemah, Zemach) may refer to:

People
 Zemah ben Hayyim, Gaon of Sura from 889 to 895
 Zemah ben Paltoi (died 890), Gaon at Academy at Pumbeditha
 Jacob ben Hayyim Zemah (17th century), Portuguese kabalist and physician
 Tzemach Dawid (1541–1613), Jewish chronicler, mathematician, historian, astronomer and astrologer
 Tzemach Cunin (1976–2019), American rabbi, and the founder of the Chabad of Century City in Los Angeles, California
 Tzemach Tzedek (1789–1866), Menachem Mendel Schneersohn
 Eddy Zemach, Professor Emeritus in the Department of Philosophy at the Hebrew University of Jerusalem

Places
 Tzemah Junction, a road junction and industrial zone at the southern tip of the Sea of Galilee
 Tzemah, a former Palestinian Arab village

See also 
 Zemach, a surname